Magnolia sambuensis is a species of plant in the family Magnoliaceae. It is found in Colombia and Panama. It is threatened by habitat loss.

References

sambuensis
Vulnerable plants
Taxonomy articles created by Polbot